Alfred Tomasz Olek (23 July 1940 – 10 March 2007), was a Polish footballer, who played for Górnik Zabrze, Scottish club Hamilton Academical and once for the Poland national team.

Olek was one of three Polish international players who moved to Hamilton in 1971, the others being Roman Strzałkowski and goalkeeper Witold Szygula. A contemporary report in The Herald newspaper described it as "one of the strangest transfer deals recorded in Scottish football". The deal was arranged by the Hamilton chairman, Jan Stepek, who was a Polish businessman. Alan Dick, who was the Hamilton club secretary at the time, later reflected that the three players did not stay for very long because they were "clearly too good for us".

References

1940 births
2007 deaths
People from Świętochłowice
Polish footballers
Poland international footballers
Górnik Zabrze players
Hamilton Academical F.C. players
Scottish Football League players
Polish expatriate footballers
Expatriate footballers in Scotland
Polish expatriate sportspeople in Scotland
Sportspeople from Silesian Voivodeship
Association football midfielders